Paris Half Marathon (French: Semi-marathon de Paris), known as the Harmonie Mutuelle Semi de Paris for sponsorship reasons, is an annual half marathon held every March in Paris, France since 1993.

Kenya's Stanley Biwott is the men's course record holder, with his winning time of 59:44 from the 2012 race. The women's course record is held by Pauline Njeri, who ran a time of 1:07:55 that same year. Around 30,000 runners took part in the event in 2011.

The 2020 edition of the race was cancelled due to the coronavirus pandemic, with all registrants given the option of transferring their entry to 2021, obtaining a voucher of equivalent value, or obtaining a refund after 18 months.

Winners 
Key: 
 Source:

See also 
 20 Kilomètres de Paris
 Paris Marathon

Notes

References

Half marathons in France
Athletics in Paris
Recurring sporting events established in 1993
Annual sporting events in France
1993 establishments in France
Spring (season) events in France